Richard Burtenshaw Elms (born 5 April 1949) is a former English professional cricketer. Elms played as an all-rounder who batted right-handed and bowled left-arm fast-medium pace. He was born in Sutton in Surrey in 1949.

Having played for the county second Xi since 1967, Elms made his first-class cricket debut for Kent County Cricket Club in the 1970 County Championship against Hampshire. In 1971 he appeared more regularly for Kent, making his List A cricket debut against Sussex. Elms played for Kent in 55 first-class and 46 List-A matches. His final first-class appearance for Kent came in 1976 against Glamorgan and his final List-A appearance came in the same season against the same opposition.

In 1977 Elms joined Hampshire, making his debut against Somerset. He played 17 first-class and eight one-day matches for Hampshire, with his final appearances coming in the 1978 season.

After leaving professional cricket, Elms moved to South Africa where he became a cricket coach in Transvaal.

References

External links

1949 births
Living people
People from Sutton, London
People from Surrey
English cricketers
Kent cricketers
Hampshire cricketers